Paul Burrard  (29 May 1678 – 1735) of Walhampton, Hampshire was a British Whig politician who sat in the House of Commons between 1705 and 1735.
 
Burrard was the eldest son of Paul Burrard of Walhampton, Hampshire and his wife Anne Button, daughter of John Button of Lymington. He became a freeman of Lymington in 1699. He married  Lucy Dutton, daughter of Sir William Dutton Colt, envoy to the courts of Hanover, Dresden, Celle and Brunswick on 17 October 1704. In 1706 he succeeded his father to Walhampton.

At the 1705 English general election, Burrard   was returned as Whig Member of Parliament for Lymington where  his family shared the interest with the Dukes of Bolton. He voted for the Court candidate for Speaker on 25 October 1705 and supported the Court  in the proceedings over the ‘place clause’ of the regency bill on 18 February 1706 but was otherwise inactive in Parliament. In 1706,  he was appointed a sub-commissioner of prizes at Portsmouth but resigned that office in November 1707. He was mayor of Lymington for the year 1708 to 1709. He was re-elected for Lymington at the 1708,  and in parliament he supported the naturalization of the Palatines in 1709 and voted for the impeachment of Dr Sacheverell in 1710. He was  mayor of Lymington again for the year 1711 to 1712, but did not stand at  the 1713 British general election. In 1714 he was appointed receiver of the land tax for Hampshire and in December 1714 commissioner for leather duty and  commissioner for taxes in Hampshire with a salary of £500 p.a.

Burrard was Mayor of Lymington again from 1716 to 1717. In 1718 he yielded up the post of commissioner for leather duty, but remained as commissioner for taxes until 1722. He was appointed deputy-lieutenant for Hampshire in 1721 and Ranger of the New Forest in 1722. He was returned to Parliament at the 1722 British general election,  and again in 1727.  He was Mayor of Lymington again for the years 1726 to 1727, 1729 to 1730 and 1733 to 1734. He was returned again at the 1734 British general election. He consistently voted with the administration. except on the Excise Bill, which he opposed.

Burrard died on 30 May 1735. He and his wife had four sons and a daughter but was survived by three of his sons .

References

1678 births
1735 deaths
Mayors of places in Hampshire
Members of the Parliament of Great Britain for English constituencies
British MPs 1708–1710
British MPs 1710–1713
British MPs 1722–1727
British MPs 1727–1734
British MPs 1734–1741